Li Yunze (born September 1970) is a Chinese banker and politician, currently serving as executive vice governor of Sichuan.

He is a representative of the 20th National Congress of the Chinese Communist Party and an alternate member of the 20th Central Committee of the Chinese Communist Party.

Biography
Li was born in Yantai, Shandong, in September 1970. In 1989, he entered Tianjin University, where he majored in Marxism. He also received his MBA from Peking University in 2010 and a PhD in Economics from the Graduate School of the Chinese Academy of Social Sciences in August 2016.

After attending university in 1993, Yunze was assigned to the Tianjin Heping Branch of the People's Construction Bank of China (now China Construction Bank). He joined the Chinese Communist Party in May 2001. He was named an assistant governor of the Tianjin Branch in September 2003. He moved up the ranks to become vice governor in June 2005 and governor of the Chongqing Branch in March 2015.

In June 2017, he was chosen as vice governor of the  Industrial and Commercial Bank of China.

He was appointed vice governor of Sichuan in September 2018 and was admitted to member of the Standing Committee of the CCP Sichuan Provincial Committee, the province's top authority.

References

1970 births
Living people
People from Yantai
Peking University alumni
Tianjin University alumni
People's Republic of China politicians from Shandong
Chinese Communist Party politicians from Shandong
Alternate members of the 20th Central Committee of the Chinese Communist Party